The bay cat (Catopuma badia), also known as the Bornean bay cat, is a small wild cat endemic to the island of Borneo that appears to be relatively rare compared to sympatric wild cats, based on the paucity of historical, as well as recent records. Since 2002, it has been listed as Endangered on the IUCN Red List because it is estimated that fewer than 2,500 mature individuals exist, and that the population declined in the past.
The bay cat has been recorded as rare and seems to occur at relatively low density, even in pristine habitat.

Taxonomy and evolution
Felis badia was the scientific name proposed by John Edward Gray in 1874, who first described a bay cat skin and skull collected by Alfred Russel Wallace in 1856 in Sarawak. This cat was first thought to be a kitten of an Asian golden cat.
In 1932, Reginald Innes Pocock placed the species in the monotypic genus Badiofelis. In 1978, it was placed in the genus Catopuma.

Tissue and blood samples were acquired only in late 1992 from the female brought to the Sarawak Museum. Morphological and genetic analysis confirmed the close relationship with the Asian golden cat, and that the two species had been separated from a common ancestor for 4.9 to 5.3 million years, long before the geological separation of Borneo from mainland Asia.

The bay cat's classification as Catopuma was widely recognized until 2006. Because of the evident close relationship of the bay cat and the Asian golden cat with the marbled cat, all three species were suggested in 2006 to be grouped in the genus Pardofelis.

Characteristics

The bay cat's fur is of a bright chestnut colour, but paler beneath, the limbs and the tail being rather paler and more reddish. The ears are rounded, covered with a short blackish-brown fur at the outer side, paler brown within and with a narrow brown margin. The tail is elongated and tapering at the end, with a white central streak occupying the rear half of the lower side, gradually becoming wider and of a purer white towards the tip, which has a small black spot at its upper end.

Its short, rounded head is dark greyish-brown with two dark stripes originating from the corner of each eye, and the back of the head has a dark 'M'-shaped marking. The backs of the ears are dark greyish without any white spot. The underside of the chin is white, and two faint brown stripes are on the cheeks.
In the years between 1874 and 2004, only 12 specimens were measured.

Distribution and habitat 
In the 19th century, only seven bay cat skins surfaced, but a living individual was caught only in 1992. It was trapped on the Sarawak – Indonesian border and brought to the Sarawak Museum on the verge of death.
In the mid-1990s, the most reliable sightings have been reported in Gunung Palung National Park and the upper Kapuas River in West Kalimantan. Two concentrations were reported in the island's interior at the time, in habitat types varying from swamp forests, lowland dipterocarp forest to hill forests up to at least .
It inhabits dense tropical forests, and has been observed in rocky limestone outcrops and in logged forest, and close to the coast. At least three specimens were found near rivers, but this was probably due to collector convenience rather than evidence of habitat preference. In 2002, a bay cat was photographed in Sarawak's Gunung Mulu National Park. From 2003 to 2005, 15 single bay cats were observed in Sarawak, Sabah and Kalimantan, but none in Brunei. Almost all the historical and recent records are from close proximity to water bodies such as rivers and mangroves, suggesting the bay cat may be closely associated with such habitats. In central Sarawak, just one individual was recorded in more than a year of camera trapping in an area that was regenerating from logging.

This record expanded the known range of the bay cat to the north.
The bay cat was photographed off-trail in seven of eight records, indicating that it tends to avoid logged areas.
A repeated survey in Kalabakan Forest Reserve in 2018 yielded records in just eight of 74 locations during more than 7,200 camera trap days.

In Central Kalimantan, a single bay cat was recorded in a mosaic of heath and peat swamp forest in the Rungan River catchment area during surveys between 2016 and 2018.

Ecology and behavior 
The secretive and nocturnal behavior of the bay cat, and possibly the low population density, may be an important cause for the rarity of sightings. Camera trapping surveys during 2003–2006 yielded only one photo of a bay cat in 5,034 trap nights. According to unconfirmed anecdotal records from Sarawak, a bay cat was observed on a branch  from the ground close to the river during a night hunting expedition. A local animal collector near Lachau, Sarawak, claimed he accidentally trapped two bay cats on separate occasions in December 2003. He reported the bay cats entered his aviary and attacked his pheasants. One cat died in captivity, and the other was released.

Nothing is known about its feeding ecology and reproductive behavior.

Threats 

The bay cat is forest-dependent and increasingly threatened by habitat destruction following deforestation in Borneo. Habitat loss due to commercial logging and conversion to oil palm plantations pose the greatest threat to the bay cat. Oil palm plantations are likely to expand in the future as a result of the push for biofuels. Borneo has one of the world's highest deforestation rates. While in the mid-1980s, forests still covered nearly three-quarters of the island, by 2005 only 52% of Borneo was still forested. Both forests and land make way for human settlement.
Less than 6% of Indonesia's and Malaysia's land region is protected.

Poaching for the illegal wildlife trade also poses a significant threat. Bay cats have been captured in the wild for the trade as pets and skins.

Conservation
The bay cat is listed on CITES Appendix II. It is fully protected by national legislation across most of its range. Hunting and trade are prohibited in Kalimantan, Sabah, and Sarawak. The bay cat remains one of the least studied of the world's wild cats, hampering the development of conservation actions.

References

External links 

Felines
Endemic fauna of Borneo
Mammals of Borneo
Mammals of Indonesia
Carnivorans of Malaysia
Mammals described in 1874
Taxa named by John Edward Gray
Fauna of the Borneo montane rain forests